Kochanowski (feminine Kochanowska) is a Polish surname. Notable people include:

 Andrzej Kochanowski (1542–1596), Polish nobleman and poet
 Augusta Kochanowska (1868–1927), Polish painter and illustrator
 Jakub Kochanowski (born 1997), Polish volleyball player
 Jan Kochanowski (1530-1584), Polish poet
 Janusz Kochanowski (1940-2010), Polish lawyer and diplomat
 Michał Kochanowski (1757-1832), Polish Chamberlain and nobleman
 Piotr Kochanowski (1566-1620), Polish nobleman and poet
 Roman Kochanowski (1857-1945), Polish painter and illustrator

See also
 

Polish-language surnames